Loncke is a surname of Dutch origin. Notable people with the surname include:

 Gérard Loncke (1905–1979), Belgian cyclist
 Jacob Lambrechtsz. Loncke (1580–1644), Dutch painter
 Joycelynne Loncke, Guyanese academic
 Louis-Philippe Loncke (born 1977), Belgian adventurer

Surnames of Dutch origin